Outerbanks Entertainment is an American production company based in Los Angeles, founded in 1995 by screenwriter Kevin Williamson.

It produced the CW series The Vampire Diaries (2009–2017). Past credits include  Dawson's Creek (1998–2003). It also produced the series Glory Days (2002) for The WB and Wasteland (1999) for ABC.

It also served as the production company on Scream 4 (2011) and Sick (2022).

Its name is a reference to Williamson's origins in Oriental, North Carolina.

Television series

Films

References

 
Television production companies of the United States
Film production companies of the United States
Companies based in Los Angeles
Mass media companies established in 1995